Condetto Nénékhaly-Camara (10 September 1930 – 22 July 1972) was a poet and playwright from Guinea.

Two plays by Nénékhaly-Camara, Continent Afrique and Amazoulou, were published in France in 1970, and translated into English in 1975. Amazoulou was an epic drama about the Zulu King Shaka.

References

External links
 Djamilah Nenekhaly, "Biographie d’Ibrahima Basil Nénékhaly-Condetto Camara, poète et dramaturge guinéen," Aminata.com

1930 births
1972 deaths
Guinean poets
Guinean dramatists and playwrights
20th-century poets
20th-century dramatists and playwrights
Male poets
Male dramatists and playwrights
Guinean male writers
20th-century male writers